English River 192H is an Indian reserve of the English River First Nation in Saskatchewan. It is an island in Porter Lake (Saskatchewan).

References

Indian reserves in Saskatchewan
Division No. 18, Saskatchewan